Adnan Sami Khan (born 15 August 1971) is an Indian singer, musician, music composer and pianist. He performs Indian and Western music, including for Hindi, Kannada, Telugu and Tamil movies. He has been awarded with Padma Shri (India's fourth highest civilian award) for his remarkable contribution in music. His most notable instrument is the piano. He has been credited as "the first musician to have played the santoor and Indian classical music on the piano". A review in the US-based Keyboard magazine described him as the fastest keyboard player in the world and called him the keyboard discovery of the nineties.

He was raised and educated in the United Kingdom and spent his life in Canada. He was born to Arshad Sami Khan, a Pakistani Air Force veteran and diplomat of Pashtun origin, and Naureen, who was originally from the Indian Union territory of Jammu and Kashmir. The Times of India has called him the "Sultan of Music". In 2016 he became an Indian citizen. He was awarded the Padma Shri on 26 January 2020.

Early life and education
Sami was born in London, England on 15 August 1971. He was raised and educated in the United Kingdom. His father, Arshad Sami Khan, was a Pakistani Pashtun while his mother Naureen Khan was an Indian from Jammu. Adnan's father served as a Pakistan Air Force pilot, before becoming a senior bureaucrat and serving as Pakistan's ambassador to 14 countries. His paternal great-great-grandfather, General Ahmed Jan, was from Afghanistan and a military advisor to king Abdur Rahman Khan. His paternal great-grandfather Agha Mehfooz Jan was the governor of four Afghan provinces under King Amanullah Khan's reign and was also the King's first cousin, while his paternal grandfather Abdul Sami Khan served as the Deputy Inspector General of Police. Agha Mehfooz Jan was assassinated by Habibullah Kalakani and therefore Sami's father's family migrated to Peshawar, then in British India.

Sami attended Rugby School in Rugby, West Midlands, UK. Adnan followed his bachelor's degree with a law degree (LLB) from King's College London. He went on to qualify as a barrister from Lincoln's Inn, England.

He had played the piano since the age of five and composed his first piece of music when he was nine years old. Sami began taking lessons in Indian classical music from the santoor maestro Pandit Shivkumar Sharma when visiting India during his school vacations. Indian singer Asha Bhosle saw him at age ten at an R. D. Burman concert in London, and encouraged him to take up music as a career. He is an accomplished concert pianist, music composer and singer with a command of Indian and Western classical/semi-classical music, jazz, rock and pop music. As a teenager, Adnan, when performing on the piano on a TV program in Stockholm, was described by the US-based Keyboard magazine as the fastest man on keyboard in the world and the keyboard discovery of the nineties. Sami went on to learn Indian classical music from Pandit Shivkumar Sharma, the Santoor maestro in India. At the age of sixteen, Sami was approached to write a song for famine-hit Ethiopia, for which he won a special award from UNICEF.

In his career of 32 years, Sami has won many international awards including the Nigar Award, Bolan Academy Award and Graduate Award. Adnan is the youngest recipient of the Naushad Music Award for Excellence in Music. Previous recipients of this award include Lata Mangeshkar and Music Maestro Khayam. Sami was invited as a member of the jury of the music festival Voice of Asia competition held annually at Almaty, Kazakhstan.

Career

His first single, "Run for His Life", was released in 1986. It was in English, and recorded for UNICEF. It went to No. 1 in the music charts in the Middle East. This was followed by three more No. 1s: "Talk to Me", "Hot Summer Day" and "You're My Best Kept Secret".

His first formal album, The One & Only (1989), was a classical album on the piano accompanied by tabla maestro Zakir Hussain. He released his first vocal solo album Raag Time in 1991. The song from his album Teri Yaad was the title track of his first album, which became a huge hit in Pakistan.

In 1994, he composed music for a film for the first time. The 1995 Pakistani film Sargam, in which he was the lead actor and Indian playback singer Asha Bhosle did the playback Sargam, was a box office success. It was also the first time that an Indian playback singer was featured in an album in Pakistan. To date Sargam is the only film Sami has acted in, and the score is the best-selling album of all time in Pakistan.

In 2000, Asha Bhosle collaborated with Sami on a collection of love songs named Kabhi to Nazar Milao in India. The music was also composed by Adnan. The album became an instant success and topped the Indipop charts for most of 2001 and 2002. According to Business Week magazine, the album sold 4 million copies in India alone.

Two songs from the album Kabhi To Nazar Milao, whose music video featured model Aditi Gowitrikar, and Lift Karaa De, whose music video starred the popular Indian actor Govinda became popular at that time. The videos were shot by Anil Mehta, who had shot popular Hindi films like Hum Dil De Chuke Sanam and Lagaan. Because of the album's success, Magnasound and Sami released an album named Always Yours which was a remix version of numbers from that album.

He soon became popular, which led Hindi filmmaker Boney Kapoor to invite him to provide music for his film. This was the beginning for him to compose and sing for Hindi films and for the top Hindi film producers of the time like Yash Chopra and Subhash Ghai. Due to the popularity of his music videos and live performances, he started getting acting offers at the same time.

The song "Tu Sirf Mera Mehboob" from the Hindi film Ajnabee, sung by Adnan, became popular and was declared a "superhit" by Screen Magazine, who called him the pop personality of the year in 2001.

In 2002, Pepsi Foods made Sami its brand ambassador in India, a contract which involved hosting a series of live music concerts across cities as well as featuring in ads for Pepsi products. He is the only artist in all of Asia and Europe to have endorsed Pepsi Cola and Coca-Cola together.

According to the Pakistani newspaper Dawn, no Pakistani artist has ever managed to gain as much popularity in India as Sami has. According to an article in The Times of India, Sami is the "most successful face in non-film music in India".

His second studio album, Tera Chehra, was released in October 2002 to critical acclaim. The music videos for this album were shot by Binod Pradhan, who had shot the popular 2002 Hindi film Devdas. The album features Bollywood stars Rani Mukerji in the title track and Amitabh Bachchan in the track "Kabhi Nahi", who also sang the duet with Sami. Actress Mahima Chaudhry was also seen in another song. The title track was written by well-known Hindi movie lyricist Sameer. According to Screen Magazine, it was the only successful pop album of the year. Sami's Tera Chehra broke sales records by becoming India's best-selling album of 2002 (including film soundtracks), continuing its No. 1 position in 2003, and by becoming the best-selling Indian album of all time (including film soundtracks) in the U.S. and Canada. The album stayed in the No. 1 position in all the music charts of India from the time of its release in September 2002 for over a year, beating his debut album's No. 1 record.

Saathiya (2002) brought him the opportunity to work with A. R. Rahman in the form of "Aye Udi Udi". According to Screen Magazine, the song was "the highlight of the album". Rediff.com called him the "Reigning King of Indipop" in early 2003 based on the sales of his albums in the previous two years.

His most successful albums have been Kabhi To Nazar Milao (with Asha Bhosle) and Tera Chehra, and his music videos usually have had Bollywood stars in them, including Namrata Shirodkar ("Bheegi Bheegi Raat"), Mahima Chaudhry, Raveena Tandon, Rani Mukerji ("Tera Chehra"), Govinda, Fardeen Khan, Amisha Patel ("O Meri Jaan"), Bhumika Chawla ("Maahiya"), Dia Mirza ("Pal Do Pal") and Amitabh Bachchan (Kabhi Nahi).

Since 2003, he has sung for a few Tamil movies like Boys, Aaytha Ezhuthu composed by A. R. Rahman. The songs, "Boom Boom" from Boys and "Nenjamellam Kadhal" from Aayitha Ezhuthu, were hits. He also sang for the Tamil and Telugu versions besides the Hindi version of songs from the movie Yuva (2004), whose music was also composed by A. R. Rahman. Besides Rahman, he has also worked with composer Yuvan Shankar Raja, and sang the Tamil songs "Oh Intha Kadhal" from Satham Podathey and "OruKal" from Siva Manasula Sakthi. He sang the song "Chanchadi Adi Urang Nee" in the Malayalam movie Makalkku. He has also sung for a Kannada film. His first Kannada song was "Don't Worry Madabeda" for the film Super Star starring Upendra. He has also worked with music composers Devi Sri Prasad and M. M. Keeravani and sang songs in Telugu films Varsham, Chatrapathi, Shankar Dada MBBS and 100% Love.

In 2005, he suffered from lymphoedema and developed an abscess in the knee, which interrupted his career.

In 2006, he took a sabbatical and reportedly lost 130 kg. He came back in April 2007 with the album Kisi Din. In 2007, he sang the soundtrack "Dil Kya Kare" from the Hindi film Salaam-e-Ishq: A Tribute to Love and "Noor-e-Khuda" from My Name Is Khan. He was also one of the guest judges on the Sa Re Ga Ma Pa Challenge 2007.

He has composed film music for several other Hindi films, including Lucky: No Time for Love, Yeh Raaste Hain Pyar Ke, Dhamaal, 1920, Chance Pe Dance, Mumbai Salsa, Khubsoorat, Sadiyaan, Shaurya and several others.

As a classical concert pianist, Sami has given solo performances before royalty such as the King of Sweden and King Hussein of Jordan. He has performed before heads of state and governments such as President Mitterrand of France, the President of the United Arab Emirates, the President and Prime Minister of India, the President and Prime Minister of Pakistan, the President and Prime Minister of Kazakhstan, the Prime Minister of Kyrgyzstan, the Prime Minister of Sweden and Princess Christina of Sweden. Adnan has performed for music festivals to sold-out stadiums of his solo concert tours all over the world in over forty countries.

Sami wrote a song for India during the 2003 Cricket World Cup. The video of this song captures the nationalistic spirit of competition, depicting Adnan performing with the Indian cricket team with guest appearances from Indian film stars like Amitabh Bachchan, Abhishek Bachchan, Fardeen Khan and Kareena Kapoor.

His work has associated him with prominent people from the Indian film and music industry.

On 15 December 2002, BBC World Service celebrated 70 years of broadcasting by organizing a worldwide live concert with artists representing different parts of the world who performed before a global audience via satellite. Sami was chosen to represent India.

In the summer of 2003, Sami became the only musical artist from the entire Asian region to have sold out Wembley Stadium in London for two nights in a row; this was recorded in the Limca Book of World Records (Asia's equivalent to the West's Guinness Book of World Records). He did this again in 2005, 2008, and 2012.

In 2010, Sami received the "Lifetime Achievement Award" from the Prime Minister of Pakistan at a ceremony by Pakistan Television.

In 2011, Sami was given the "Glory of India Award" by the India International Friendship Society. This was the 350th anniversary of the completion of the Taj Mahal, and Sami gave a solo concert performance in front of the Taj Mahal on the final night of the celebrations. After this performance, the Indian media dubbed him the "Sultan of Music".

He hosted the Indian version of the American music game show Don't Forget the Lyrics! called Bol Baby Bol on the Star TV network in 2008. Prior to that in 2005, he was the sole jury for the singing competition program on Channel [V] called Super Singer. In 2011, Adnan returned as a judge on the singing reality show Sa Re Ga Ma Pa L'il Champs, which became popular worldwide.

He performed a qawwali "Bhar Do Jholi Meri" in the 2015 film Bajrangi Bhaijaan, he appeared in the movie as well.

Personal life
Sami first married to actress Zeba Bakhtiar in 1993, with whom he had a son named Azaan Sami Khan. They divorced after three years.

Sami began living in India since 13 March 2001, on a visitor's visa which was extended from time to time.

In 2001, Sami married Dubai-based Arab Sabah Galadari. This was his second marriage and Sabah's second marriage as well; she had a son from her previous marriage. This relationship also ended in divorce, a year-and-a-half later.

In June 2006, he weighed 230 kilograms (506 lb); he claimed his doctor had given him just six months to live. By diet and exercise, he lost  in 16 months.

In 2008, his wife Sabah returned to Mumbai, remarried him and began living with him, but the marriage only lasted one year, after which Sabah filed for divorce again.

In 2009, his father died of pancreatic cancer, which he described as the "biggest blow" of his life, saying that he had been extremely close to his father.

On 29 January 2010 Sami married Roya Sami Khan, the daughter of a retired diplomat and army general. He first met Roya in India during her visit in 2010 and proposed to her after some time. On 10 May 2017, he became a father to a daughter, Medina Sami Khan.

On 26 May 2015, he submitted a request for Indian citizenship to the Ministry of Home Affairs, when his Pakistani passport expired, he had lived an adequate number of years in India that made him eligible for Indian citizenship hence he naturalised as an Indian citizen. In late December 2015, the Indian Home Ministry approved his request for legal status as a citizen of India, effective as of 1 January 2016.

Filmography

As an actor
 Sargam (1995)
 Bajrangi Bhaijaan (2015)

As a playback singer

Urdu songs

Hindi songs

Telugu songs

Tamil songs

Kannada songs

Other languages

As a music director and composer
 Sargam (1995)
 Love at Times Square (2003)
 Lucky: No Time for Love (2005)
 Dhamaal (2007)
 Mumbai Salsa (2007)
 Khushboo (2008)
 1920 (2008)
 Shaurya (2008)
 Daddy Cool, co-director: Raghav Sachar
 Sadiyaan (2010)
 Chance Pe Dance (2010), co-director: Pritam Chakraborty, Ken Ghosh, Sandeep Shirodkar

Discography

Badaltay Mausam (1997) was re-released in India as Kabhi To Nazar Milao (2000).

Awards and accolades

Sami has won a number of international awards, including the Nigar Award, the Bolan Academy Award, and the Graduate Award. He was given a special award by UNICEF for the song he wrote for famine-hit Ethiopia as a teenager and a United Nations Peace Medal for a song he wrote and performed for Africa.

A review of his piano solo performance on British TV Channel 4 in Keyboard magazine called him the "Keyboard Discovery of the 90s".

In 2001, he was awarded the Breakthrough Artist of the Year by MTV.

Swedish and British radio and television have often referred to him as the fastest keyboard player in the world. Adnan has performed for prestigious music festivals to sold-out stadiums of his solo concert tours all over the world in over forty countries. In summer 2003, he became the only Asian artist to have sold out Wembley Stadium, London, for two consecutive nights, which won him a place in the Limca Book of Records.

As a classical concert pianist, Sami has given performances before the King of Sweden and King Hussein of Jordan.

In 2007, Sami was given a Special Award from the U.K. Parliament (House of Commons) for his 'Outstanding Contribution to Sub-Continental Music'.

In 2008, he was presented the "Naushad Music Award" by Andhra Pradesh Department of Culture, in Hyderabad.

In 2008 he also won "Best International Act" at the UK Asian Music Awards.

In 2013, he was given the BrandLaureate International Brand Personality award by the President of The BrandLaureate, Dr KK Johan, in Kuala Lumpur, Malaysia.

Later in 2013, Sami was given a Special Award by the Canadian Parliament for his 'Exceptional Services to Indian Music'.

In April 2017, Sami became the first South Asian to have performed at London's Wembley Stadium 8 times; tickets were sold out on all 8 occasions. The Mayor of London, Sadiq Khan, attended the concert.

In January 2020, he was awarded the Padma Shri, India's fourth highest civilian honour in the field of Arts, by Government of India. He received the award from President of India on 8 November 2021

Notes

References

External links 
 Interview on Republic TV by Arnab Goswami.
 

1971 births
Living people
Alumni of King's College London
Indian film score composers
Indian male playback singers
Indian male pop singers
Indian television presenters
Indian Muslims
Indian people of Pashtun descent
Indian pop composers
Bollywood playback singers
Urdu playback singers
Telugu playback singers
Tamil playback singers
Kannada playback singers
Musicians from London
Musicians from Mumbai
Nigar Award winners
Pakistani emigrants to India
Indian people of Afghan descent
Naturalised citizens of India
People educated at Rugby School
People who lost Pakistani citizenship
Indian male film score composers
Recipients of the Padma Shri in arts